Neil Booth (born 19 February 1968) is a former Northern Irish international lawn and indoor bowler and bowls team coach and manager.

Bowls career
Booth has won three World Championship medals starting with the gold medal in the fours at the 2004 World Outdoor Bowls Championship in Ayr with Jonathan Ross, Noel Graham and Jim Baker. This was followed by two bronze medals in 2012.

In addition he has won four Commonwealth Games medals. He won the gold medal in the fours at the 1998 Kuala Lumpur with Gary McCloy, Ian McClure and Martin McHugh. He won a bronze in 2002, a silver medal in 2006 and another silver in 2014.

Booth retired from international competition in 2014.

Coaching
Booth was selected as a coach for the Northern Ireland team for the 2018 Commonwealth Games on the Gold Coast in Queensland. He was team manager for the 2020 World Outdoor Bowls Championship in Australia.

References

External links
 
 
 

1968 births
Living people
Male lawn bowls players from Northern Ireland
Bowls World Champions
Commonwealth Games medallists in lawn bowls
Commonwealth Games gold medallists for Northern Ireland
Commonwealth Games silver medallists for Northern Ireland
Commonwealth Games bronze medallists for Northern Ireland
Bowls players at the 1998 Commonwealth Games
Bowls players at the 2002 Commonwealth Games
Bowls players at the 2006 Commonwealth Games
Bowls players at the 2014 Commonwealth Games
Medallists at the 1998 Commonwealth Games
Medallists at the 2002 Commonwealth Games
Medallists at the 2006 Commonwealth Games
Medallists at the 2014 Commonwealth Games